Kodyma Raion was a raion (district) in Odesa Oblast of Ukraine. Its administrative center was the city of Kodyma. The raion was abolished and its territory was merged into Podilsk Raion on 18 July 2020 as part of the administrative reform of Ukraine, which reduced the number of raions of Odesa Oblast to seven.  The last estimate of the raion population was

References

Former raions of Odesa Oblast
1940 establishments in Ukraine
Ukrainian raions abolished during the 2020 administrative reform